David Durand (July 27, 1920 – July 25, 1998) was an American juvenile actor.

Career
Durand appeared in the silent film Tropic Madness (1928) when age 8, of which a complete version is considered lost. However, one reel (14 minutes) was discovered in 2022 and is now available on YouTube on the Rainscratch channel. Durand also appeared in the films Get Your Man, Tropic Madness, Innocents of Paris, Song of Love, Ladies Love Brutes, The Jazz Cinderella, Bad Sister, The Spy, Rich Man's Folly, Probation, Forbidden Company, Silver Dollar, The Great Jasper, Son of the Border, The Life of Jimmy Dolan, Jennie Gerhardt, Cradle Song, As the Earth Turns, Viva Villa!, Hat, Coat, and Glove, Wednesday's Child, Little Men, The Band Plays On, Wells Fargo, Scouts to the Rescue, Off the Record, Streets of New York, Boys' Reformatory, Golden Gloves, The Tulsa Kid, Harmon of Michigan, Kid Dynamite, Keep 'Em Slugging, Mr. Muggs Steps Out, and Million Dollar Kid, among others.

Durand's final film as an actor was Follow the Leader in 1944, after which he worked behind the scenes in the movie business.

Personal life
Durand served in the United States Army during World War II. He died on July 25, 1998, in Bridgeview, Illinois at age 77. His daughter, Judi Durand, is a voice artist on numerous motion pictures and video games.

References

External links
 
 

1920 births
1998 deaths
Male actors from Cleveland
Military personnel from Cleveland
20th-century American male actors
American male film actors
United States Army personnel of World War II